The Väinö Linna Square is a courtyard-type square at the Finlayson's old factory area in Tampere, Finland. It is part of the Tammerkoski rapids' industrial landscape, which in 2009 was classified by the Finnish Heritage Agency as a nationally significant built cultural environment. The oldest building in the square is the six-storey old factory called Kuusivooninkinen (1837), which was Finland's first modern factory building. In 1995, the square was named after Väinö Linna, who formerly worked in that building and was later known as a very significant writer.

Finlayson's textile production in the area ended in the mid-1990s, after which renovation of the buildings began. The Väinö Linna Square was renovated in 2005. At the same time, a new hospital was completed on its edge, on the site of a demolished factory building, and The Portrait of Väinö Linna (1995) was placed on the outer wall; the granite statue is one of the latest works by sculptor Raimo Heino.

Sources

References

External links

 Martti Heikkinen: Väinö Linnalle aukio Finlaysonin alueelle (in Finnish) – Helsingin Sanomat, September 10, 1994. Retrieved September 20, 2021.
 Jari Mylläri: Lähde iltakävelylle Finlaysonin alueelle – Väinö Linnan aukiolle tehtaan seinään tuli kaupungin suurin valkokangas (in Finnish) – Aamulehti, February 6, 2020. Retrieved September 20, 2021.

Squares in Tampere
Tourist attractions in Tampere